Aaronson is a Jewish patronymic surname, meaning "son of Aaron". It is unknown as a given name. Aaronson or its variants may refer to:

 Brenden Aaronson (born 2000), American soccer player
 David "Noodles" Aaronson, fictional character of the 1952 novel The Hoods by Harry Grey
 Hubert Aaronson (1924–2005), American metallurgist
 Irving Aaronson (1895–1963), American jazz pianist
 Kenny Aaronson (born 1952), American bass guitar player
 Lazarus Aaronson (1894–1966), British poet
 Marc Aaronson (1950–1987), American astronomer
 Ruth Aaronson Bari (1917–2005), American mathematician
 Scott Aaronson (born 1981), American computer scientist
 Stuart A. Aaronson (born 1942), American cancer biologist
 Susan Ariel Aaronson (born 1954), American author, public speaker and economist
 Trevor Aaronson, American journalist
Aaronsohn
 Aaron Aaronsohn (1876–1919), Romanian-born Palestinian Jewish agronomist, botanist, traveler, entrepreneur, and Zionist politician
 Alexander Aaronsohn (1888–1948), Romanian-born Palestinian Jewish activist and author who wrote about the plight of people living in Palestine (now Israel)
 Sarah Aaronsohn  (1890–1917), Jewish spy working for the British in World War I, sister of Aaron Aaronsohn

See also 
 Aronson

References 

Jewish surnames
Patronymic surnames